Hwabon station is a railway station in Gunwi County. It is on the Jungang Line.

External links
 Cyber station information from Korail

Railway stations in North Gyeongsang Province
Gunwi County
Railway stations opened in 1938